The City of Lake St. Louis is a planned community situated around two lakes between Interstate 70 and Interstate 64 in western St. Charles County, Missouri, United States. The population was 16,707 as of the 2020 US Census.

History
In January 1961, Ellis Ellerman and Ira Nathan begin developing plans for a private resort community, a popular concept in the 1960s in the St. Louis region.  The vision was for a weekend resort with a lake large enough for recreation and a location close to St. Louis.  Ellerman and Nathan hired engineers to begin the initial planning of the lake and community, and Nathan named the project "Lake St. Louis" in 1961.

Ellerman and Nathan formed Trails Lake Development Corp. in 1962, and by August 31 of that year, 10 lots had already been sold in the project, which was to feature a 625 lake (PD article 8-25-63). Ellerman and Nathan lacked adequate financing and business experience, and they soon found themselves in over their heads on the project. Ellerman and Nathan were soon joined by several other investors to keep the project afloat, including R. T. Crow.  The financial troubles continued for Ellerman and Nathan, and The Healey Discount Corp., owned by Crow and the three other investors, foreclosed on Ellerman and Nathan's Trails Lake Development Corp. in June 1966.

R. T. Crow felt the location of "Lake St. Louis" (indicating a change of ownership and the "planned community" concept), between two major highways, I-70 and Rt. 61, and the westward growth of St. Louis justified building a new town, rather than just the weekend community envisioned by Ellerman and Nathan. He investigated the idea of new towns, including visiting many  others in the east. In the end, Crow bought out the other three investors who were part of The Healey Discount Corp., and he became the sole developer of the Lake St. Louis development. St. Charles County approved the preliminary plan for Lake St. Louis in April 1967. People who had purchased lots from the first developers were given credits for lots in the new Lake St. Louis project.

The first residents of Lake St. Louis were the Neal family, who moved to an existing home on the property in January, 1968. Gene Neal later became a vice president of one of Crow's companies, his wife Hazel managed the Lake St. Louis Country Club. Son Mike played the "boy" of various mythical families in the development's television and print advertising, and later was a founding member of the community's water ski club.

By 1969, the  Lake Ste. Louise, the 9-hole, 3-par golf course, tennis courts, clubhouse and pool were open. Construction on the dam for the  Lake St. Louis, the larger of the two lakes in the community, began in 1968. It was completed in 1972, and Crow filed for Chapter 11 Bankruptcy in 1974 - an action brought on in part by the energy crisis. Also, the I-70 bridge over the Missouri River was closed partially while the second bridge was added. The combination of events suddenly made Lake St. Louis too far away from employment and retail centers.

With Crow out of the picture, and the looming threat of annexation from O'Fallon on the East and Wentzville on the West, the residents of the Harbor Town area of the community petitioned St. Charles County Circuit Court for incorporation of the Town of Harbor Town. The Court granted the petition in June, 1975, and with the approval of the incorporation, the Circuit Court appointed a Board of Trustees: George Heidelbaugh, Charles Bailey, David Spitznagel, Betty Patton and Howard Haddock as Chairman. In December 1975, the town boundaries were expanded to include what was known as Phase A, the westernmost portion of the city. In 1976, a special census was conducted that counted 2,445 residents. Residents voted in 1977 to change the name to Lake St. Louis and become a 4th Class City under the Revised Statutes of Missouri. Howard Haddock was elected as the first mayor of the city.

Community association
The two lakes in the city of Lake St. Louis are private lakes owned by the membership of the Lake St. Louis Community Association (LSLCA). The LSLCA was formed to maintain and administer the Lake St. Louis amenities and provide services for the recreation-oriented community. The community association is funded by an assessment on all property within the LSLCA membership area. Originally all owners of property inside the city were automatically members of the LSLCA; however, as the city grew, the need to prevent lake overcrowding resulted in newer residential developments not having membership in the LSLCA. Since the lakes, as well as a country club, marinas, and several park areas, are private property of the community association, they are not available for use by non-members. This means that many residents of the city are not permitted to use the lakes, because their property is not covered by LSLCA membership.

Geography
Lake St. Louis is located at  (38.785620, -90.783610).

Demographics

2010 census
As of the census of 2010, there were 14,545 people, 5,816 households, and 4,213 families residing in the city. The racial makeup of the city was 92.2% White, 3.8% African American, 0.3% Native American, 2.1% Asian, 0.1% Pacific Islander, 0.3% from other races, and 1.1% from two or more races. Hispanic or Latino of any race were 2.1% of the population.

There were 5,816 households, of which 31.5% had children under the age of 18 living with them, 60.8% were married couples living together, 7.8% had a female householder with no husband present, 3.8% had a male householder with no wife present, and 27.6% were non-families. 22.2% of all households were made up of individuals, and 7.4% had someone living alone who was 65 years of age or older. The average household size was 2.50 and the average family size was 2.94.

The median age in the city was 41.3 years. 23.4% of residents were under the age of 18; 7.1% were between the ages of 18 and 24; 24.6% were from 25 to 44; 29% were from 45 to 64; and 16% were 65 years of age or older. The gender makeup of the city was 49.5% male and 50.5% female.

2000 census
Per the census of 2000,it is estimated there were 13,708  people, 3,923 households, and 3,005 families residing in the city. The racial makeup of the city was 95.60% White, 1.84% African American, 0.25% Native American, 0.97% Asian, 0.04% Pacific Islander, 0.40% from other races, and 0.89% from two or more races. Hispanic or Latino of any race were 1.35% of the population.

There were 3,923 households, out of which 32.4% had children under the age of 18 living with them, 68.0% were married couples living together, 6.4% had a female householder with no husband present, and 23.4% were non-families. 18.5% of all households were made up of individuals, and 4.9% had someone living alone who was 65 years of age or older. The average household size was 2.59 and the average family size was 2.97.

In the city, the population was spread out, with 24.5% under the age of 18, 6.8% from 18 to 24, 27.3% from 25 to 44, 29.6% from 45 to 64, and 11.8% who were 65 years of age or older. The median age was 40 years. For every 100 females, there were 98.1 males. For every 100 females age 18 and over, there were 95.0 males.

The median income for a household in the city was $68,830, and the median income for a family was $80,700. Males had a median income of $57,201 versus $30,335 for females. The per capita income for the city was $32,064. About 2.1% of families and 3.9% of the population were below the poverty line, including 6.9% of those under age 18 and 4.5% of those age 65 or over.

Education
The residents of Lake St. Louis are part of the Wentzville R-IV School District.

Economy

Top employers
According to the Lake St. Louis Comprehensive Annual Financial Report for the Fiscal Year Ended June 30, 2018, the top employers in the city were:

Commercial development
When Schnucks opened a store on the city's previously undeveloped south side in 2004, at the intersection of I-64 and Lake St. Louis Boulevard, it marked the beginning of a rapid retail and commercial growth for the city. This was the first new retail development the city had seen in 17 years. In addition to the Schnucks development, the National Information Solutions Cooperative (NISC) also announced plans to build its $18 million 135,000-square-foot headquarters near the same intersection in 2004. The initial commercial development of 2004 was soon followed by the development of two large retail districts in the city: The Shoppes at Hawk Ridge and The Meadows at Lake St. Louis. Prior to this period of current retail growth, the city had very little commercial development. Residents of the lakeside community traveled to nearby Wentzville or O'Fallon for most shopping, dining, and other service needs that were not previously available in the city.

The Shoppes at Hawk Ridge
Bounded by I-64 to the north, South Fox Hound Drive to the east, and Hawk Ridge Trail to the South, the Shoppes at Hawk Ridge is an 800,000 sq ft (74,000 m2) retail development situated on the south side of Lake St. Louis. The development was spurred by the new $26 million Hwy N overpass completed in October 2005, which eventually became part of the Page Avenue extension. The development was the largest retail project in St. Charles County at the time of its construction, and it opened in January 2006. The Hawk Ridge development is anchored by St. Charles County's first Wal-Mart Supercenter, Lowe's, and numerous smaller retailers and restaurants. The Wal-Mart Supercenter was the most expensive store the company ever built, according to developer Don LaBrayere. Building styles and landscaping play a vital role in the look of the development. Businesses such as White Castle and Steak 'n Shake were forced to abandon their standard store designs and color schemes in order to comply with style elements of the development.

The Meadows at Lake St. Louis
The second major retail development that anchors the Lake St. Louis retail district is The Meadows at Lake St. Louis. Opened in August 2008, the Meadows is an open-air shopping district geared toward the community's affluent residents. The Meadows was developed to meet the growing demand for specialty stores and restaurants in St. Charles County, and it was billed as the first lifestyle center in the county. It features two landscaped boulevards in a downtown street grid, surrounded by 500,000 sq ft (46,000 m2) of restaurants and a variety of specialty retail stores. The retail portion of the development is anchored by upscale specialty department store Von Maur. Kansas City-based Ferguson Properties also plans to build a 110- to 120-room Marriott or Hilton branded hotel geared toward business travelers as part of the lifestyle center. In March 2012 the Meadows announced over the next five years, four more retail buildings and the addition of a Neiman Marcus or Saks Fifth Avenue. There are also plans that have been approved for a Hilton Hotel.

Notable people
 Howard "Chingy" Bailey, Jr., Platinum selling music artist
 Jud "Fabio" Birza, winner of Survivor: Nicaragua
 Don Coryell, former NFL Head Coach
 Jonathan Dolan, Missouri State Senator
 Cornell "Nelly" Haynes, Jr., Grammy Award-winning music artist. His house in Lake St. Louis was featured on MTV Cribs.
 Alonzo "Zo" Lee Jr. of The Trak Starz, Grammy award-winning music producer
 Shaun Murray, Four time World Champion wakeboarder
 Cal Neeman, former Major League Baseball catcher
 Bob Onder, Missouri State Senator
 Dave Phillips, Retired Major League Baseball umpire

References

External links
 City of Lake St. Louis
 Lake St. Louis Community Association
 Lake St. Louis Dardenne Prairie Area Chamber of Commerce

Cities in St. Charles County, Missouri
Cities in Missouri